

Gustav Höhne (17 February 1893 – 1 July 1951) was a German general during World War II who held commands at the division and corps levels. He was a recipient of the Knight's Cross of the Iron Cross with Oak Leaves of Nazi Germany.

Awards and decorations
 Iron Cross (1914) 2nd Class (23 September 1914) & 1st Class (31 August 1915)
 Clasp to the Iron Cross (1939) 2nd Class (24 September 1939) & 1st Class (20 October 1939)
 Knight's Cross of the Iron Cross with Oak Leaves
 Knight's Cross on 30 June 1941 as Generalmajor and commander of 8. Infanterie-Division
 Oak Leaves on 17 May 1943 as Generalleutnant and commander of Korps "Laux"

References

Citations

Bibliography

 
 

1893 births
1951 deaths
People from Inowrocław County
People from the Province of Posen
Generals of Infantry (Wehrmacht)
German Army personnel of World War I
Prussian Army personnel
Recipients of the Knight's Cross of the Iron Cross with Oak Leaves
German prisoners of war in World War II
Recipients of the clasp to the Iron Cross, 1st class
Reichswehr personnel
German Army generals of World War II